Daniel J. Leonard (born March 18, 1949) is an American politician. He was a member of the Indiana House of Representatives from the 50th District, serving from 2002 until 2022. A businessman, he is a member of the Republican party. In May 2022, Leonard lost his renomination bid for the State House to Lorissa Sweet.

References

Living people
Republican Party members of the Indiana House of Representatives
1949 births
21st-century American politicians
Place of birth missing (living people)
People from Huntington, Indiana